Llanarth is a privately owned estate village and community within a conservation area in the Welsh county of Monmouthshire.

History
One of the earliest mentions of the village is in the Book of Llandaff, written in 1125 CE, where it is rendered with the spelling "Llangarth". The village's name translates as either "church on the ridge of the hill” or possibly “church with a garth (yard)”. Both attest to the presence of a chapel with resident priest (Llan).

Settlement within the area potentially dates back to the 6th century CE. In 880 a Bishop by the name of Nudd was resident within Llanarth.

The Church of St Teilo in the village stands on the foundation of an older, previous church. In 1891 this church was restored, and for over a century catered to Anglican worshippers. Just over a century later, in 2013, the church was declared redundant, owing to the unsustainable cost of necessary repairs.

The Llanarth estate and its forestry are notable for their numerous coast redwood and giant redwood conifer specimens, which were likely planted in the 19th century following sapling transportation from California.

Facilities 
 
Llanarth is surrounded by farmland and forestry which is managed by the Trustees of Llanarth Estate. Within the estate's forestry and land holdings are designated riding bridleways and routes that any horseback rider may use for a nominal fee.

Within the village there is a village hall and sports club with a well-equipped cricket and football pitch, a sports pavilion and a children's play area. Llanarth has a Roman Catholic church, the Church of St Mary and St Michael located within the grounds of Llanarth Court . Primary education is available in Raglan, about three miles away, and secondary education is available in Abergavenny or Monmouth.

Llanarth Court is also in the vicinity of Llanarth village. Once a private country house  of a branch of the Herbert family and home to Ivor Herbert, 1st Baron Treowen, then a fee-paying private boys' school, it is now a private hospital.

Notable residents
Sarah Bill, the mother of Australian prime minister Alfred Deakin, was born on a farm in the parish of Llanarth

References

Villages in Monmouthshire